The Cambridge municipal election, 2006 took place on November 13, 2006 for the city of Cambridge, Ontario, Canada, to elect a city mayor, city councillors, a regional chair, regional councillors, and school board members. It was held in conjunction with all other municipalities in Ontario.

Results

Mayoral race

City council

Regional councillor
(2 to be elected)

2006 Ontario municipal elections